Varagavan is a village in the Berd Municipality of the Tavush Province of Armenia. The 13th-century Nor Varagavank monastery is located 3.5 km southwest of Varagavan.

Gallery

References

External links 

Populated places in Tavush Province